Cristian Shiba (born 31 January 2001) is an Albanian professional footballer who plays as a right back for  club Pontedera.

Club career
Born in San Benedetto del Tronto, Shiba joined the Sassuolo youth sector on 17 August 2017.

On 4 May 2018, he was loaned to Serie D club Sangiustese.

For the 2020–21 season, he was loaned to Serie C club Ravenna. On 23 September 2020, he signed with the club. Shiba made his professional debut on 27 September against Südtirol.

On 6 July 2021, he signed with another Serie C club, Pontedera.

International career
Shiba was a youth international for Albania.

References

External links
 
 

2001 births
Living people
People from San Benedetto del Tronto
Sportspeople from the Province of Ascoli Piceno
Albanian footballers
Association football fullbacks
Serie C players
Serie D players
U.S. Sassuolo Calcio players
Ravenna F.C. players
U.S. Città di Pontedera players
Albania youth international footballers
Footballers from Marche
A.C. Sangiustese players